The Malayan forest gecko or banded bent-toed gecko (Cyrtodactylus pulchellus) is a species of gecko found in Southeast Asia.

Description
Head large, much depressed, oviform; snout longer than the orbit, the diameter of which equals its distance from the ear-opening; forehead and loreal region concave; ear opening suboval, vertical, slightly oblique, one third to two fifths the diameter of the eye. Body and limbs rather elongate. Digits strong, slightly depressed at the base, strongly compressed in the remaining portion; the basal phalanx with well-developed transverse plates beneath. Head granular, with small round tubercles on the occipital and temporal regions, the granules enlarged on the snout, except in the frontal and loreal concavities. Rostral subquadrangular, nearly twice as broad as deep, with median cleft above, and entering the nostril to a considerable extent; the latter directed backward, pierced between the rostral, the first labial, and three or four nasals; 10 to 13 upper and 10 to 12 lower labials; mental triangular; two or three pairs of chin-shields, median largest and in contact behind the point of the mental; throat minutely granulate. Body and limbs above with small flat granules intermixed with small roundish, keeled, subtrihedral tubercles; a series of keeled tubercles from axilla to groin, limiting the abdominal region; ventral scales cycloid, imbricate, moderately large. Males with a longitudinal groove on the pubic region containing two parallel series of preanal pores, forming a right angle with a long series of femoral pores; altogether 18 to 20 pores on each side, 4 or 5 of which are in the groove. Tail cylindrical, tapering, above with small flat scales and annuli of feebly keeled tubercles, beneath with a series of large transverse plates. Light brown above, with broad chestnut-brown, light-edged cross bands, which are narrower than the interspaces between them; the anterior horseshoe-shaped, from eye to eye over the nape; the second crescent-shaped, on scapular region; three others on the body; tail with chestnut-brown complete annuli; lower surfaces dirty white. From snout to vent 4 inches; tail 5.

Distribution
NE India (Bengal), Burma, Singapore, Thailand (Phatthalung, Trang, Nakhon Si Thammarat, Satun), Malaysian Peninsula, Penang, Pulau Langkawi & Perak. Cyrtodactylus abrae, found on the Cape York Peninsula and northern Queensland in Australia, is now considered a synonym.

Notes

References
 Boulenger, G.A. 1885 Catalogue of the Lizards in the British Museum (Nat. Hist.) I. Geckonidae, Eublepharidae, Uroplatidae, Pygopodidae, Agamidae. London: 450 pp.
 Das, I. & Lim, L.J. 2000 A new species of Cyrtodactylus (Sauria: Gekkonidae) from Pulau Tioman. Raffles Bull. Zool. (Singapore) 48 (2): 223-231
 Gray, J. E. 1827 A Synopsis of the Genera of Saurian Reptiles in which some new Genera are indicated, and the others reviewed by actual Examination. Phil. Mag., London, 2 (2): 54-58.
 Gray, J. E. 1845 Catalogue of the specimens of lizards in the collection of the British Museum. Trustees of die British Museum/Edward Newman, London: xxvii + 289 pp.
 Rösler, H. 2000 Die postanale Beschuppung bei Cyrtodactylus Gray 1827 und Cyrtopodion Fitzinger 1843 - funktionelle und taxonomische Aspekte (Sauria: Gekkonidae). Gekkota 2: 154-207
 Taylor, E.H. 1963 The lizards of Thailand. Kans. Univ. Sci. Bull., Lawrence, 44: 687-1077.

External links
 
 http://www.uroplatus.com/photopage/images/Cyrtodactylus%20pulchella%2001.jpg
 

Reptiles of India
Reptiles of Myanmar
Geckos of Malaysia
Reptiles of Singapore
Geckos of Thailand
Cyrtodactylus
Reptiles described in 1827